

Incumbent
Lord: Henry VIII

Events
 June 6: Archduke Ferdinand, son of Philip the Fair of Burgundy and his wife, Joanna the Mad, and grandson to King Ferdinand and Queen Isabella visit Kinsale.

Births

Deaths

References

 
1510s in Ireland
Ireland
Years of the 16th century in Ireland